The Theological College of Central Africa (abbreviation TCCA)—now known as The Evangelical University—is a Bible college affiliated with the Evangelical Fellowship of Zambia (EFZ) and is based in Ndola, Zambia.

Established in 1983, the college's purpose is to provide a theological education with internationally recognized academic accreditation, and also to equip students for practical ministry. It offers a four-year degree in Theology and a three-year diploma on Theology, both accredited by the Accrediting Council for Theological Education in Africa (ACTEA).

External links 
Theological College of Central Africa website
Evangelical Fellowship of Zambia website
ACTEA website
International Council for Evangelical Theological Education website

References

Evangelical seminaries and theological colleges
Universities and colleges in Zambia
Educational institutions established in 1983